Chokri Khatoui is a Tunisian football manager.

References

Year of birth missing (living people)
Living people
Tunisian football managers
Ohod Club managers
ES Métlaoui managers
AS Gabès managers
EO Sidi Bouzid managers
US Ben Guerdane managers
Stade Tunisien managers
Najran SC managers
CS Hammam-Lif managers
US Tataouine managers
Tunisian Ligue Professionnelle 1 managers
Saudi First Division League managers
Tunisian expatriate football managers
Expatriate football managers in Saudi Arabia
Tunisian expatriate sportspeople in Saudi Arabia